Calytrix flavescens, commonly known as summer starflower, is a species of plant in the myrtle family Myrtaceae that is endemic to Western Australia.

Description
It usually blooms between October and January producing yellow star-shaped flowers. The plant is perennial and has a short lifespan. The foliage is evergreen with a dense open habit.

Taxonomy
The species was first formally described by the botanist Allan Cunningham in 1834 in the journal Botanical Magazine.

Distribution
Found on sand-plains, gentle slopes and sometimes in swampy areas in the Mid West, Wheatbelt, South West and Great Southern regions of Western Australia where it grows on sandy soils over granite, laterite or sandstone.

Cultivation
It grows from seed but can be propagated from softwood or hardwood cuttings. Grown in pots and gardens as a feature plant, it attracts bees when in flower and flowers can be cut. It is both drought resistant and frost tolerant.

References

flavescens
Endemic flora of Western Australia
Myrtales of Australia
Rosids of Western Australia
Plants described in 1834
Taxa named by Allan Cunningham (botanist)